In electromagnetism, electric flux is the measure of the electric field through a given surface, although an electric field in itself cannot flow.

The electric field E can exert a force on an electric charge at any point in space. The electric field is the gradient of the potential.

Overview
An electric charge, such as a single electron in space, has an electric field surrounding it. In pictorial form, this electric field is shown as a dot, the charge, radiating "lines of flux". These are called Gauss lines. Note that field lines are a graphic illustration of field strength and direction and have no physical meaning. The density of these lines corresponds to the electric field strength, which could also be called the electric flux density: the number of "lines" per unit area. Electric flux is proportional to the total number of electric field lines going through a surface.  For simplicity in calculations, it is often convenient to consider a surface perpendicular to the flux lines. If the electric field is uniform, the electric flux passing through a surface of vector area  is

For a non-uniform electric field, the electric flux  through a small surface area  is given by

(the electric field, multiplied by the component of area perpendicular to the field).  The electric flux over a surface  is therefore given by the surface integral:

For a closed Gaussian surface, electric flux is given by:

where
  is the electric field,
  is any closed surface,
  is the total electric charge inside the surface ,
  is the electric constant (a universal constant, also called the "permittivity of free space")
This relation is known as Gauss' law for electric fields in its integral form and it is one of Maxwell's equations.

While the electric flux is not affected by charges that are not within the closed surface, the net electric field,  can be affected by charges that lie outside the closed surface. While Gauss's law holds for all situations, it is most useful for "by hand" calculations when high degrees of symmetry exist in the electric field.  Examples include spherical and cylindrical symmetry.

The SI unit of electric flux is the volt-meter, or, equivalently, newton-meter squared per coulomb.

See also 
 Magnetic flux
 Maxwell's equations
 Electric field
 Magnetic field
 Electromagnetic field

Citations

References 
 Purcell, Edward, Morin, David; Electricity and Magnetism, 3rd Edition; Cambridge University Press, New York. 2013 .
 Browne, Michael, PhD; Physics for Engineering and Science, 2nd Edition; McGraw Hill/Schaum, New York; 2010.

External links 
 Electric flux – HyperPhysics

Electrostatics
Physical quantities